Notorious Gallagher is a 1916 American silent drama film directed by William Nigh and starring Nigh, Marguerite Snow and Robert Elliott.

Cast
 William Nigh as Buttsy Gallagher 
 Jules Cowles as Michael Gallagher 
 Roy Applegate as Judge Winters 
 R.A. Bresee as Gus Ewing 
 Robert Elliott as Robert Ewing 
 Martin Faust as Count Carl 
 David Thompson as Detective Cody 
 Victor De Linsky as Lefty Jake 
 Frank Montgomery as Frank the Mex 
 Marguerite Snow as Peggy Winters 
 Florence Vincent as Florence Maddern 
 Cecelia Griffith as Mrs. Maddern 
 Cita Cameron as The Pest 
 Mrs. William Nigh as Sloppy Sue

References

Bibliography
 James Robert Parish & Michael R. Pitts. Film directors: a guide to their American films. Scarecrow Press, 1974.

External links
 

1916 films
1916 drama films
1910s English-language films
American silent feature films
Silent American drama films
Films directed by William Nigh
American black-and-white films
Metro Pictures films
1910s American films